Methyltyramine may refer to:

 α-Methyltyramine (4-hydroxyamphetamine)
 β-Methyltyramine
 N-Methyltyramine
 2-Methyltyramine
 3-Methyltyramine